This is a list of Churchill Brothers Sporting Club's managers (head coaches) and their records, from 2007, when the first professional manager was appointed, to the present day.

Coaching list

Information correct as of 1 October 2012. Only competitive matches are counted. Wins, losses and draws are results at the final whistle; the results of penalty shoot-outs are not counted.

  

Key
* Served as caretaker manager.